Edrastima is a genus of flowering plants in the family Rubiaceae. The genus widespread and is found in Central and Eastern USA and the tropics and subtropics.

Species
Edrastima angolensis 
Edrastima cephalotes 
Edrastima goreensis 
Edrastima trinervia 
Edrastima uniflora  (formerly Oldenlandia uniflora)

References

Rubiaceae genera
Spermacoceae
Taxa named by Constantine Samuel Rafinesque